Amanda C. Farías (born July 9, 1989) is an American politician from New York City. She is the Democratic city council member for the 18th district of the New York City Council, which covers Soundview, Parkchester, and Castle Hill in the Bronx. She sits on the transportation committee, is chair of Committee on Economic Development, and Co-Chair of the Women’s Caucus.

Early life
Farías was born in Soundview in the Bronx to Dominican and Puerto Rican parents. She graduated from Preston High School in 2007, and went on to receive both her undergraduate and master's degree in political science from St. John's University in 2011 and 2012, respectively.

Post-graduation, Farías worked briefly for Barack Obama's re-election campaign before joining the staff of Councilwoman Elizabeth Crowley of Queens, where she remained until her own bid for the City Council.

Political career

2017 City Council campaign
In 2017, Farías ran for the 18th district of the New York City Council, which was held by term-limited Democrat Annabel Palma. Farías was one of several candidates in the Democratic primary aiming to defeat Rubén Díaz Sr., a longtime conservative and controversial state senator with the support of the Bronx Democratic Party apparatus.

Despite Farías' endorsements from some sitting councilmembers and other groups aiming to prevent a Díaz victory, her campaign was seen as fighting an uphill battle against the well-connected and well-funded Díaz. On election night in September, Díaz emerged victorious with 42 percent of the vote; Farías received 21 percent, and three other candidates running to Díaz's left took the remainder.

Inter-Council years
Fresh off her loss for City Council, Farías successfully ran for Democratic state committee, defeating a 21-year incumbent in the process. She also worked for a series of activist and nonprofit organizations, including New American Leaders, Riders Alliance, Women of Color for Progress, and the Consortium for Worker Education.

2021 City Council campaign
Early in 2019, Farías announced that she would seek a rematch against Díaz, now an incumbent. However, Díaz surprised observers in July 2020 when, after an unsuccessful bid for Congress, he announced he would not seek re-election to a second term on the City Council.

Now running for an open seat, Farías was able to consolidate support to a far greater extent than in 2017. The Bronx Democratic Party, which had supported Díaz four years earlier, endorsed Farías, as did Congressman Ritchie Torres and most other local elected officials. Her main opponent in the primary was Bronx Community Board 9 district manager William Rivera, who had the support of Bronx Borough President Rubén Díaz Jr. (the incumbent's son) and who came under fire for seemingly diverting thousands of the board's dollars to his own nonprofit.

Farías topped the eight-candidate field on election night with 27 percent of the vote; after absentee ballots and ranked-choice votes were counted, she defeated Rivera 52-48%, and formally declared victory on July 7. She later won the general election by a wide margin and took office on January 1, 2022.

Personal life
Farías lives in Soundview.

References

Living people
1989 births
Politicians from the Bronx
St. John's University (New York City) alumni
New York (state) Democrats
American politicians of Dominican Republic descent
American politicians of Puerto Rican descent
Puerto Rican people in New York (state) politics
Hispanic and Latino American women in politics
21st-century American women politicians
21st-century American politicians
Women New York City Council members
New York City Council members